Kurt Wigartz (21 March 1933 – 5 January 2017) was a Swedish gymnast. He competed at the 1952 Summer Olympics, the 1956 Summer Olympics and the 1960 Summer Olympics.

References

External links
 

1933 births
2017 deaths
Swedish male artistic gymnasts
Olympic gymnasts of Sweden
Gymnasts at the 1952 Summer Olympics
Gymnasts at the 1956 Summer Olympics
Gymnasts at the 1960 Summer Olympics
People from Mariestad Municipality
Sportspeople from Västra Götaland County